Hamad Al-Attiyah (born 23 June 1995) is a Qatari equestrian. He competed in the individual jumping competition at the 2016 Summer Olympics.

References

External links
 

1995 births
Living people
Qatari male equestrians
Show jumping riders
Equestrians at the 2016 Summer Olympics
Olympic equestrians of Qatar
Equestrians at the 2018 Asian Games
Asian Games bronze medalists for Qatar
Asian Games medalists in equestrian
Medalists at the 2018 Asian Games